Donald Allen Wilson (born July 28, 1961) is a former professional gridiron football defensive back. Playing collegiately for North Carolina State University, he played in the National Football League for the Buffalo Bills (1984–1985). He then played in the Canadian Football League for twelve years with the Edmonton Eskimos (1987–1989, 1993–1994, 1998), the Toronto Argonauts (1990–1992, 1995–1996), and the BC Lions (1997). He was named to the Argonauts all-time team in 2007.

He was inducted into the Canadian Football Hall of Fame as a player in 2021.

References

External links
NFL.com player page
Pro-Football-Reference.com page

1961 births
Living people
African-American players of American football
African-American players of Canadian football
American football defensive backs
American football return specialists
BC Lions players
Buffalo Bills players
Canadian football defensive backs
Canadian football return specialists
Edmonton Elks players
NC State Wolfpack football players
Players of American football from Washington, D.C.
Toronto Argonauts players
Canadian Football Hall of Fame inductees